The Charles Chapman House is a historic house in Mankato, Minnesota, United States.  It was built around 1858.  It was listed on the National Register of Historic Places in 1980 for its local significance in the theme of exploration/settlement.  It was nominated for its association with Charles Chapman, an early surveyor and city engineer who played a key role in Mankato's initial development.

See also
 National Register of Historic Places listings in Blue Earth County, Minnesota

References

1858 establishments in Minnesota
Houses completed in 1858
Houses in Blue Earth County, Minnesota
Houses on the National Register of Historic Places in Minnesota
Mankato, Minnesota
National Register of Historic Places in Blue Earth County, Minnesota